Tuinan (also Romanized as Ţūīnān; also known as Ţūnīān and Tūnīān) is a village in Kuhgir Rural District, Tarom Sofla District, Qazvin County, Qazvin Province, Iran. At the 2006 census, its population was 200, in 52 families.

References 

Populated places in Qazvin County